Kawempe Division (sub-county)  is one of the five divisions that comprise the city of Kampala along with Makindye division, Lubaga division, Nakawa division and Central division, It has 19 parishes and 771 villages. The parishes include Bwaise I, Kanyanya, Kazo ward, Kyebando, Makerere iii, Mulago I, Bwaise ii, Kawempe I, Kikaya, Makerere I, Mpererwe, Mulago iii, Bwaise III, Kawempe ii, Komambogo, Makerere ii, Mulago i, Makerere University. The division's current mayor is His worship Dr. Emmanuel Serunjogi.

Location
Kawempe Division   is located in the Northern part of Kampala, it's one of the five divisions that make up Kampala city bordering Wakiso District to the west, north and east, Nakawa Division to the southeast, Kampala Central Division to the south, and Lubaga Division to the southwest. The coordinates of the division are 00 23N, 32 33E (Latitude:0.3792; Longitude:32.5574).

The neighborhoods in Kawempe Division include:
Kawempe, Kanyanya, Kazo, Mpererwe, Kisaasi, Kikaya, Kyebando, Bwaise, Komamboga, Mulago, Makerere, and Wandegeya.

Overview
Kawempe Division is the largest division in Kampala, with an estimated population 388,665. Kawempe Division has a high mortality and morbidity burden compared to the other four divisions in the city. A survey in 2013, ranked it highest in HIV/AIDS transmission out of the five divisions within Kampala. Crime is also of concern.

See also
Kawempe
Kampala Capital City Authority
Kampala central division
Nakawa division
Makindye division
Rubaga division

References

External links
 KCCA Receives €1 Million to Improve Sanitation In Kawempe Division
 Google Map of the Kawempe Division of Kampala

 
Geography of Kampala
Populated places in Uganda